Yako Airport  was a public use airport located near Yako, Passoré Province, Burkina Faso.

Google Earth Historical Imagery shows a  dirt runway 07/25 at the listed coordinates in December 2001, but the area has since been built over with structures.

See also
List of airports in Burkina Faso

References

External links 
 Airport record for Yako Airport at Landings.com

Defunct airports
Airports in Burkina Faso
Passoré Province